Soreang–Pasir Koja Toll Road or Soroja is a toll road connecting Soreang to Pasir Koja in Bandung Regency, West Java, Indonesia. The 10.6-kilometer toll road section connects with the existing Purbaleunyi Toll Road, linking Soreang, the capital of Bandung Regency, with a direct access to the capital city Jakarta and the Cikarang industrial area to the north. The toll road will connect directly to Purbaleunyi Toll Road at KM 132, which connects westward to Cikampek and Jakarta and eastward to Cileunyi. The toll road was inaugurated by Indonesian President Joko Widodo on 4 December 2017.

Sections
The toll road has 3 sections,
Pasirkoja-Margaasih-3.05 km
Margaasih-Katapang −2.2 km
Katapang-Soreang −2.9 km

Exits

See also

Trans-Java toll road

References

Toll roads in Indonesia
Transport in West Java